Zajączkowski (feminine: Zajączkowska) is a Polish surname. Notable people include:

 Andrzej Zajączkowski (1922–1994), Polish sociologist, culture anthropologist, Africanist
 Bolesław Zajączkowski (1891–1920), Polish lawyer and reserve officer of the Polish Army
 Christian Zajaczkowski (born 1961), French former footballer and manager
 Grzegorz Zajączkowski (born 1980), Polish sprinter
 Małgorzata Zajączkowska, Polish actress
 Piotr Zajączkowski, Polish football player and manager
 Władysław Zajączkowski (1837–1898), Polish mathematician
 Wojciech Zajączkowski (born 1963), Polish historian, diplomat

Zajančkauskas 

 Vladas Zajančkauskas, Lithuanian war criminal

Zajonczkowski 

  (1859–1920), a Russian state official

See also 

 Zajkowski
Ruda Zajączkowska (village in Poland)



Polish-language surnames

ru:Зайончковский